A goldsmith is a metalworker who specializes in working with gold.

Goldsmith may also refer to:

Places
 Goldsmith, Indiana, United States
 Goldsmith, New York, United States, a hamlet
 Goldsmith, Texas, United States, a city
 Goldsmith Lake, Cleveland Township, Le Sueur County, Minnesota, United States
 Goldsmith Channel, a waterway in the Canadian territory of Nunavut
 Goldsmith Glacier, Theron Mountains, Antarctica

People
 Goldsmith (surname)
 Goldsmith Bailey (1823–1862), U.S. Representative from Massachusetts
 Goldsmith Goldie Collins (1901–1982), Australian rules footballer
 Goldsmith W. Hewitt (1834–1895), U.S. Representative from Alabama

Prizes
 Goldsmiths Prize, a UK-based book award
 Goldsmith Book Prize, a US-based press, politics, and public policy book award
 Goldsmith Prize for Investigative Reporting, an award for journalists at Harvard University

Other uses
 Goldsmiths, University of London, a college in England founded by the Worshipful Company of Goldsmiths
 Goldsmith's, a department store in Memphis, Tennessee
 Goldsmiths (retailer), a jewellery retailer in Ireland and the United Kingdom
 Goldsmith Block, an historic apartment building in Boston, Massachusetts
 Goldsmith Hall, a building on the University of Texas at Austin campus
 Goldsmith Defense, an uncommon chess opening
 Goldsmith, a character in the visual novel Umineko no Naku Koro ni

See also
 Goldsmiths' Professor of Materials Science, professorship in the University of Cambridge
 Worshipful Company of Goldsmiths, one of the Great Twelve Livery Companies of the City of London

Variations on surname
 Goldsmith (surname)
 Goldschmidt family
 Goldschmidt
 Goldschmid
 Goldschmied
 Goldschmitt
 Goldsmid (name)
 Aurifaber